Elizabeth Stanhope, Countess of Chesterfield (née Butler; 1640–1665) was an Irish-born beauty. She was a courtier after the Restoration at the court of Charles II of England at Whitehall. She was the second wife of Philip Stanhope, 2nd Earl of Chesterfield.

Birth and origins 
Elizabeth was born on 29 June 1640 at Kilkenny Castle, Ireland, the eldest daughter of James Butler and Lady Elizabeth Preston. Her father was Earl of Ormond at the time, but would become marquess and finally duke of Ormond. Her father's family, the Butler dynasty, was Old English and descended from Theobald Walter, who had been appointed Chief Butler of Ireland by King Henry II in 1177.

Her mother was the only child of Richard Preston, 1st Earl of Desmond and a rich heiress. Her parents married on Christmas 1629. They had 10 children, but five died in childhood.

she was one of ten siblings, but five died as children The remaining five are listed in his father's article.

She grew up at the West Gate Castle in Thurles, County Tipperary and was, before her marriage, known as Lady Thurles, a courtesy title.

Marriage and child 
She married Philip Stanhope, Earl of Chesterfield, as his second wife, some time before 25 September 1660. He was one of the lovers of the notorious Barbara Villiers, mistress of King Charles II of England. There were many at court who believed Barbara's first child, Anne bore a strong resemblance to Chesterfield. His first wife was Lady Anne Percy, daughter of Algernon Percy, 10th Earl of Northumberland; she had died on 29 November 1654 with no surviving children.

 
Philip and Elizabeth had one daughter, Lady Elizabeth Stanhope, later Countess of Strathmore, although the child's paternity was in doubt.

According to Samuel Pepys, theirs was a marriage of convenience, but Chesterfield, despite his own past conduct with Barbara Villiers, became jealous when rumours spread that his wife was having affairs with both James Hamilton and James, Duke of York, with whom she is said to have been caught in flagrante delicto. On the other hand, he describes Elizabeth as "a virtuous lady".

In the Memoirs of Count Gramont it is claimed that King Charles II of England told Gramont that his brother (the Duke of York) was in love with Elizabeth. He also says of Elizabeth that, "she had a most exquisite shape, though she was not very tall: her complexion was extremely fair, with all the expressive charms of a brunette: she had large blue eyes, very tempting and alluring: her manners were engaging: her wit lively and amusing; but her heart, ever open to tender sentiments, was neither scrupulous in point of constancy, nor nice in point of sincerity."

In May 1663, the couple went to live at Bretby in Derbyshire. It was around this time that their daughter, Elizabeth was born.

Death and legacy 
Lady Chesterfield died in July 1665 shortly after her 25th birthday and was buried on 18 July 1665 at Wellingborough, Northamptonshire.

Her daughter, Lady Elizabeth (May 1663 – 24 April 1723), who was a child of two years at the time of Elizabeth's death, married John Lyon, 4th Earl of Strathmore and Kinghorne in 1691; the couple had 10 children. Elizabeth Bowes-Lyon, Queen consort of George VI of the United Kingdom was one of her many descendants.

Elizabeth's portrait was painted by Sir Peter Lely, and at one time belonged to Horace Walpole.

Notes and references

Notes

Citations

Sources 

 
 
  – Canonteign to Cutts (for Chesterfield)
  – Scotland and Ireland
 
 
  – 1 April 1661 to 31 December 1662
 

1640 births
1665 deaths
17th-century English nobility
17th-century English women
Elizabeth
Daughters of English dukes
English countesses
Mistresses of James II of England
Elizabeth